Nguyễn Quốc Cường (born 28 October 1949) is a Vietnamese sports shooter. He competed at the 1980 Summer Olympics, the 1988 Summer Olympics and the 1992 Summer Olympics.

References

External links
 

1949 births
Living people
Vietnamese male sport shooters
Olympic shooters of Vietnam
Shooters at the 1980 Summer Olympics
Shooters at the 1988 Summer Olympics
Shooters at the 1992 Summer Olympics
Place of birth missing (living people)
Asian Games medalists in shooting
Shooters at the 1982 Asian Games
Shooters at the 1990 Asian Games
Shooters at the 1994 Asian Games
Asian Games bronze medalists for Vietnam
Medalists at the 1982 Asian Games
21st-century Vietnamese people
20th-century Vietnamese people